Army Peak (also known as Nelson Butte) is a summit in the Nome Census Area, Alaska, United States.  Its name likely derives from the United States Army's presence in the area after the establishment of Fort Davis in 1900.

References

Mountains of Alaska
Landforms of Nome Census Area, Alaska
Mountains of Unorganized Borough, Alaska
Landforms of the Seward Peninsula